Viscount  was a lieutenant general in the early Imperial Japanese Army.

Biography
Miura was born in Hagi in Chōshū Domain  (modern Yamaguchi Prefecture), to a samurai family with the name of Andō, but was adopted by the Miura that was the family name of his father-in-law. After studying at the Meirinkan clan military academy, he entered the Kiheitai irregular militia of the Chōshū domain and played an active role in the Boshin War to overthrow the Tokugawa shogunate. He fought at the Battle of Hokuetsu.

He later held various posts in Army-Navy Ministry under the Meiji government and was commander of the Hiroshima District. He helped suppress the Hagi Rebellion in his native Chōshū. During the Satsuma Rebellion, he served as commander of the Army's Third Brigade during the Battle of Tabaruzaka.

In 1882, Miura was appointed commander of the Imperial Japanese Army Academy. In 1884, he accompanied Ōyama Iwao on a tour of Europe, to study the military systems in various western countries, and favoured an army organisation modelled after the French, and on his return became commander of the Tokyo Garrison. However, Miura come into increasing conflict with the Army leadership under General Yamagata Aritomo over conscription policies, the need for a large standing army, and the government's fire-safe of the assets of the Hokkaidō Colonization Office, as well as Aritomo's favouritism for an army modelled after that of Prussia.

Yamagata and Prince Arisugawa blocked a move by Emperor Meiji to appoint Miura as Chief of staff of the Ministry of the Army in 1886, and he was transferred from Tokyo to the Kumamoto Garrison. Miura resigned rather than accept the demotion, but remained an outspoken critic of Yamagata and the direction he was taking the Imperial Japanese Army.

He became a leading member of the Getsuyōkai, an army fraternal association which had been established by the largely-French trained first graduating classes of the Army Academy. While the Getsuyōkai'''s main purpose was to encourage research into the latest military developments, under Miura the association's journal, Getsuyōkai kiji, published scathing critics of Yamataga and other army leaders, and promoted the concept of a small, defensive army. Stung by the unceasing criticism, Yamagata ordered Miura into the secondary reserves and ordered the Getsuyōkai disbanded in 1889.

Miura, who had been elevated to the title shishaku (viscount) under the  kazoku  peerage system in 1884, was appointed a member of the House of Peers from 1890, and became president of the Gakushuin Peers School from 1892.

In September 1895, Miura was appointed Japan’s resident minister in Korea, succeeding Inoue Kaoru. Miura was increasingly concerned over growing Russian influence over the Korean government, and less than a month after his arrival in Korea, Empress Myeongseong ordered the disbanding of the Japanese-trained Hullyeondae militia. Miura saw this as a first step in an attempt to remove pro-Japanese members of the government and loyalists to the Heungseon Daewongun, which would then lead to Russian intervention.

Miura then staged a counter-coup, assassinating the Empress; however, this plan backfired due to international outrage over the incident, widespread anti-Japanese violence throughout Korea, the arrest of pro-Japanese government officials and King Gojong seeking shelter in the Russian consulate. Miura initially denied any Japanese involvement in the incident, despite eye-witness accounts otherwise, and the Japanese government issued a statement that he had acted independently, without instructions from Tokyo.

Miura was recalled to Japan and placed on a trial with the involved military personnel at the Hiroshima District Court.  The trial was held for political purposes to give an impression of rule of law to Western nations.  Miura's attorney argued in defense, that killing is not murder when done to achieve political supremacy with Miura even admitting to the assassination.  Nonetheless, the court found him not guilty on technical grounds of insufficient evidence and Miura and cohorts emerged from trial as national heroes.

Later, after the Japan–Korea Annexation Treaty in 1910, Miura became a privy councilor and focused on eliminating vestiges of the clan-based factionalism from politics, gaining a reputation as an Éminence grise for fixing issues "behind-the-scenes".  On his death of uremia in 1926 he was posthumously awarded the Order of the Rising Sun with Paulownia Flowers.

Popular culture
 Portrayed by Kim Eung-soo in the 2012 film Gabi''.

Awards and decorations
 Order of the Rising Sun with Paulownia Flowers
 Order of the Rising Sun, 1st class
 Order of the Sacred Treasure, 1st class
 Order of the Crown of Italy
 Order of St. Anna, 1st class
 Order of the Crown
 Commandeur de la Légion d'Honneur
 Order of Franz Joseph

See also
 List of Ambassadors from Japan to South Korea

References

External links

1846 births
1926 deaths
People from Chōshū domain
Kazoku
People of the Boshin War
Military personnel from Yamaguchi Prefecture
Japanese generals
Regicides
People of Meiji-period Japan
Members of the House of Peers (Japan)
Recipients of the Order of the Rising Sun with Paulownia Flowers
Grand Cordons of the Order of the Rising Sun
Recipients of the Order of the Sacred Treasure, 1st class
Commandeurs of the Légion d'honneur
Recipients of the Order of St. Anna, 1st class